Wolf was the second of six Type 24 torpedo boats built for the German Navy (initially called the Reichsmarine and then renamed as the Kriegsmarine in 1935) during the 1920s. The boat made multiple non-intervention patrols during the Spanish Civil War in the late 1930s.  During World War II, she played a minor role in the occupation of Bergen during the Norwegian Campaign of April 1940. Wolf escorted minelayers once as they laid minefields in late April before beginning a refit that lasted until August. She was transferred to France around September and conducted offensive patrols in the English Channel as well as laying minefields herself. The ship struck a mine and was sunk returning from one such mission in January 1941.

Design and description
Derived from the preceding Type 23 torpedo boat, the Type 24 was slightly larger and faster, but had a similar armament. Their crew numbered 129 officers and sailors.

As built, the Type 24s mounted three  SK C/28 guns, one forward and two aft of the superstructure, numbered one through three from bow to stern. They carried six above-water 50 cm (19.7 in) torpedo tubes in two triple mounts amidships and could also carry up to 30 mines. After 1931, the torpedo tubes were replaced by  tubes and a pair of  C/30 anti-aircraft guns were added.

Construction and career
Wolf was laid down at the Reichsmarinewerft Wilhelmshaven (Navy Yard) on 8 March 1927 as yard number 109, launched on 12 October 1927 and commissioned on 15 November 1928. The boat was initially assigned to the 3rd Torpedo Boat Half-Flotilla and by the end of 1936 she was assigned to the 2nd Torpedo Boat Flotilla. She made several deployments to Spain during the Spanish Civil War. Around June 1938, Tiger was transferred to the 3rd Torpedo Boat Flotilla which was renumbered as the 6th Flotilla on 1 July.

Second World War
Wolf supported the North Sea mining operations that began on 3 September 1939. On 13, 18 and 19 November, the 6th Flotilla and one or two light cruisers met destroyers returning from minelaying missions off the English coast. The flotilla made another contraband patrol in the Skagerrak on 24–25 November.

During the Norwegian Campaign, Wolf and Leopard were assigned to Group 3 under Konteradmiral (Rear Admiral) Hubert Schmundt on the light cruiser , tasked to capture Bergen harbor. After loading troops of the invasion force in Cuxhaven, the torpedo boats and the depot ship Carl Peters proceeded independently to rendezvous with the rest of Group 3 on the afternoon of 8 April. Under orders to land his troops before dawn on 9 April, Schmundt's ships entered the Korsfjorden around midnight. They were spotted shortly afterwards by a Norwegian patrol boat which alerted the Norwegian defenses. All ships flashed light signals identifying them as British ships whenever challenged, but the Norwegians were not fooled. Schmundt ordered Leopard to assume the lead just before they entered the Byfjorden leading to Bergen around 04:00. Kvarven Fort opened fire shortly afterwards, and then Hellen Fort, but they made no hits on the leading ships before they moved out of sight into Bergen harbor at 04:13 where they began landing their troops.

Concerned that his small force could be counter-attacked by the numerous British ships reported to be operating in the North Sea and that they were within range of British bombers, Schmundt took Köln, Leopard and Wolf to sea early that evening. The torpedo boats streamed their minesweeping gear and cut the cables of two mines which floated to the surface as they proceeded through the fjords. Worried that he might be intercepted after receiving further reports of British ships off the Norwegian coast, Schmundt took his ships into the Maurangerfjord where they anchored at 02:00. Schmundt headed for home as darkness was setting in and reached Wilhelmshaven the following evening. En route, Leopard was sunk when she was accidentally rammed by the minelayer Preussen. Wolf was refitted in Stettin, Germany, from May to August.

Now assigned to the 5th Torpedo Boat Flotilla, Wolf escorted the minelayers Stralsund and Skaggerak from Le Havre to Brest, France, on 28–29 September. The flotilla made an unsuccessful sortie off the Isle of Wight on 8–9 October. They made a second, more successful, sortie on 11–12 October, sinking two Free French submarine chasers and two British trawlers. The 5th Flotilla was transferred to St. Nazaire later that month.

Notes

Notes

References
 

 
 

 

Type 24 torpedo boats
1927 ships
Ships built in Wilhelmshaven